John "Johnny" Dennis Cronshey (14 July 1926, in Brentford, England – 15 January 2004, in Axminster, Devon, England) was an English speed skater. He competed at the 1948 Winter Olympics and the 1956 Winter Olympics.

Cronshey attended his first international all-round championship at the age of 20. In 1947, he came in 16th at the European Championship. One week later he came ninth in the World Championship.

Cronshey's best international placing was the silver medal at the 1951 World Championship in Davos where he was only beaten by the Norwegian Hjalmar Andersen. It would be another 72 years before the next British Senior International medal would be achieved in 2023, by Ellia Smeding at the 2023 European Sprint Championships.

References

1926 births
2004 deaths
British male speed skaters
People from Brentford
World Allround Speed Skating Championships medalists
Olympic speed skaters of Great Britain
Speed skaters at the 1948 Winter Olympics
Speed skaters at the 1956 Winter Olympics